General elections were held in Malawi on 20 May 2014. They were Malawi's first tripartite elections, the first time the president, National Assembly and local councillors were elected on the same day. The presidential election was won by opposition candidate Peter Mutharika of the Democratic Progressive Party, who defeated incumbent President Joyce Banda.

Background
Malawi's CPI increased by 27.7% in 2013, but its GDP grew by only 5%. Malawi has maintained a polity score of 6 since 2005, designating it as a democracy. Malawi's previous presidential election in 2009 was only the fourth such election in the country's history following the end of Hastings Banda's period of one-man rule in 1994.

Bingu wa Mutharika, who had won the 2004 election, picked his foreign minister Joyce Banda to be vice president after successfully contesting the 2009 election. She was expelled from the Democratic Progressive Party and formed the People's Party when she refused to endorse President Bingu wa Mutharika's younger brother Peter Mutharika for president in the 2014 general election.

Bingu wa Mutharika died of a heart attack on 5 April 2012, and Joyce Banda took the presidency two days later, in accordance with the constitution, despite protests from some ruling party officials that Banda's expulsion from the ruling party made her ineligible.

The People's Party entered the election with a sitting president, but little in the way of a grass-roots machine.

Presidential candidates
Twelve candidates were allowed to contest in the election by the Malawi Electoral Commission:

Opinion polls
The Malawi Electoral Commission cautions that opinion pollsters in Malawi often have questionable credentials and publish biased reports. Some opinion polls have been criticised for lacking credibility and using non-scientific methods.

Results
Amid a breakdown in electronic systems for relaying results back to IEC headquarters, Banda claimed fraud and attempted to cancel the election after only one third of the votes were counted, and Peter Mutharika, brother of the president who died in 2012, was well ahead. Banda said another vote should be held within 90 days, and she said she would not be standing, but opposition parties and the Malawi Law Society objected.

Court action ensued, but the IEC said the first count would be completed, and a recount started. The result would only be announced after the recount, estimated to take two months. On 30 May 2014, the High Court ruled that any recount must be done within eight days of the vote; since the allowed period had already ended, the court ruled that the electoral commission should announce the results. Accordingly, the electoral commission declared later in the day that Mutharika had won the presidential election with 36.4% of the vote. Another opposition candidate, Lazarus Chakwera of the MCP, received 27.8%, while Banda trailed in third place with 20.2%. The head of the commission, Maxon Mbendera, said that "the rule of law compels us to release the results", although he acknowledged that some of the commission's members had "reservations" about them. Banda quickly said that she accepted the outcome, although she continued to describe the vote as "fraudulent".

Mutharika was sworn in as president on the morning of 31 May 2014. Banda congratulated Mutharika and called for national unity, urging the people to support the new president and wishing him success. An inauguration ceremony for Mutharika was held in Blantyre on 2 June 2014. Banda was not present at the inauguration, held at Kamuzu Stadium, and her absence was viewed by some as a snub, given the history of bitter rivalry between the two. Mutharika said that he was offering an olive branch and wanted to "bury the past", expressing "regret" at Banda's absence. He said that he was not interested in "vengeance", although he added that "those who have broken the law will face the full course of justice".

President

National Assembly

Local government

References

Presidential elections in Malawi
Elections in Malawi
2014 in Malawi
Malawi
May 2014 events in Africa